MasterChef Greece is a Greek competitive cooking game show based on the original British MasterChef. The show began airing on 3 October 2010 on Mega Channel and aired two seasons until 2013. From 2017, the show is airing on Star Channel. Until now eight seasons have aired on Star Channel.

The first and second season of the show aired on Mega Channel from 2010 to 2013, with Eugenia Manolidou and Mary Synatsaki as presenters, respectively.

In March 2017, Star Channel acquired the rights to the show, thus reviving MasterChef after four years and this time was not a presenter like the previous seasons. The third season premiered on 4 May 2017. Two more seasons of episodes followed in 2018 and 2019. The show was renewed for a sixth season, which premiered on 27 January 2020 on the same channel. The seventh season aired in 2021 on Star Channel.

After the completion of the first season, Mega Channel created a spin-off of the competition, in which children aged 8–13 participated and it was titled Junior MasterChef Greece. The show aired in the 2011–2012 season with Maria Mpekatorou as presenter. In 2018, Star Channel renewed Junior MasterChef for a second season, which began airing on 13 September 2018 and ended on 24 December 2018, without a presenter.

Hosts and Judges

Series overview
Until now in Greece have been aired eight seasons.

Series synopsis

Season 1 (2010)
The first season of MasterChef premiered on 3 October 2010 and ended on 28 December 2010 and was hosted by musician and television presenter Eugenia Manolidou. The judges of the Greek show were Yiannis Loukakos, Lefteris Lazarou and Dimitris Skarmoutsos. The winner was Akis Petrentzikis.

Season 2 (2012–2013)
The second season premiered on 24 December 2012. This season was hosted by Maria Synatsaki and all three chefs remain as judges. The show was put on hiatus after the penultimate episode due to financial difficulties of both the production company, Studio ATA, and Mega Channel itself, resulting in both finalists being declared winners. The two winners are Kostis Kampas and Mpampis Koudouris.

Season 3 (2017)
The third season premiered on 4 May 2017. The judges of the third season were Dimitris Skarmoutsos, Panos Ioannidis and Sotiris Kontizas. The winner of season 3 was Lambros Vakiaros.

Season 4 (2018)
The fourth season premiered on 10 January 2018. Ioannidis and Kontizas returned for their second series while Leonidas Koutsopoulos was the new judge of the series. The winner of season 4 was Timoleon Diamantis.

Season 5 (2019)
The fifth season premiered on 21 January 2019. All three chefs from the previous season returned as judges. The winner of season 5 was Manolis Sarris.

Season 6 (2020)
The sixth season premiered on 27 January 2020. All three chefs from the previous season returned as judges. The winner of season 6 was Stavros Varthalithis.

Season 7 (2021)
The seventh premiered on 23 January 2021. All three chefs from the previous season returned as judges. Margarita Nikolaidi became the first female MasterChef Greece winner.

Season 8 (2022)
The eighth season premiered οn 10 January 2022. All three chefs from the previous season returned as judges. The winner of season 6 was Panagiotis Koumoundouros.

Spin-off
Junior MasterChef Greece premiered on 27 November 2011 and ended on 5 February 2012. The judges were the same as MasterChef Greece (Yiannis Loukakos, Lefteris Lazarou and Dimitris Skarmoutsos) and it was hosted by Maria Mpekatorou. The winner was twelve-year-old Lilian Emvaloti.

The second season of Junior MasterChef Greece premiered on 13 September 2018 on Star Channel and ended on 24 December 2018. The judges were Eleni Psyhouli, Manolis Papoutsakis, Magky Tabakaki. Among 44 children, the judges choose the top 22 children (11 girls and 11 boys). The winner was twelve-year-old Konstantinos Christopoulos.

References

External links
Official Website - Star Channel
MasterChef νέα

Mega Channel original programming
Star Channel (Greek TV channel) original programming
2010 Greek television series debuts
2013 Greek television series endings
2017 Greek television series debuts
2010s Greek television series
2020s Greek television series
2010 Greek television seasons
2012 Greek television seasons
2013 Greek television seasons
2017 Greek television seasons
2018 Greek television seasons
2019 Greek television seasons
2020 Greek television seasons
2021 Greek television seasons
2022 Greek television seasons
Greek reality television series
Greece
Greek television series based on British television series